Almeidaia is a genus of moths in the family Saturniidae first described by Travassos in 1937.

Species
Almeidaia aidae O. Mielke & Casagrande, 1981
Almeidaia romualdoi Travassos, 1937

References

Arsenurinae
Moth genera